The Church of St John the Apostle, Torquay, is a Grade I listed parish church in the Church of England Diocese of Exeter on Montpellier Road in Torquay, Devon.

History
The church started in 1823 as a chapel-of-ease to the parish church at Tormoham. The current building was designed by George Edmund Street and built between 1861 and 1873. The chancel was built first by Wall and Hook of Brunscomb, Gloucester at a cost of £4,000. The chancel was consecrated by the Lord Bishop of Jamaica, the Rt Revd Aubrey Spencer, acting for the diocesan bishop, on 8 November 1864. It contained carving by Thomas Earp and mosaic work by Antonio Salviati.

The north aisle was completed next and opened in 1866. Construction on the nave and south aisle began in 1870 and it opened on 2 April 1871.

The west tower was completed in 1884–85 at a cost of £2,000 to the designs of Arthur Edmund Street and the contractor being a Mr Chubb of Torquay. Special services were held on 30 April 1885 to mark the completion of the tower. A new bell was dedicated on 7 October 1885 which was cast in E flat by Warner and Son of London with a weight of nearly 19 cwt.

The lady chapel was decorated between 1888 and 1890 by John Dando Sedding. The chapel was divided from the chancel and aisle by iron grills, and approached by a polished Torquay marble step was the ornate altar and reredos. New seating of oak was placed on oak platforms and the floor. The fronts and back were carved and traceried, and the ends of the seats had fleur de lis termination, and the sides had shields with sunken carved panels with scenes from The Passion. The work was carried out by Harry Hems of Longbrook Street, Exeter.

Incumbents

Organ
A temporary organ was acquired from Dicker of Exeter when the church opened, but when the nave was completed a new organ was built in 1872 by William Hill & Sons. The pipe organ has three manuals and pedals, with 47 speaking stops. A specification of the organ can be found in the National Pipe Organ Register.

Organists

References

Torquay
Torquay
Torquay